Isiah Winder (born 16 May 2002) is an Australian rules footballer who plays for the West Coast Eagles in the Australian Football League (AFL). He was recruited by West Coast with the 57th draft pick in the 2020 AFL draft.

AFL career
Winder made his debut as the medical substitute in West Coast's round 4 match against . After Shannon Hurn injured his calf, Winder came on ground. He scored a goal with his first kick, becoming the ninth West Coast player to do so.

References

External links
 
 
 

2002 births
Living people
West Coast Eagles players
Australian rules footballers from Western Australia
Peel Thunder Football Club players
West Coast Eagles (WAFL) players